Brussels American School (BAS) was opened in October 1967. It is located near Brussels, Belgium on a  area in Sterrebeek, part of the municipality of Zaventem, Flemish Brabant.

The school serves as a DoDDS school for all US military and DOD civilian sponsor dependents, who are allowed to enroll their children tuition free. Non-DOD persons, including U.S., Belgian, and other citizens, are required to pay tuition. It celebrated its fortieth anniversary in late 2007. It also takes European students from Partnership for Peace (PfP) countries of NATO, to include Macedonia, Armenia, Azerbaijan, Georgia etc. Its proximity to NATO (North Atlantic Treaty Organization) helps serve as an opportunity for American children to enroll in a school taught to familiarize them with the American school system.

Student body
The school has thirty-six faculty members, many of whom have been at Brussels American School for more than fourteen years. The student body holds, on average, three hundred students K-12, and approximately one hundred students in its high school. With so few students, BAS changed from Division Three to Division Four in the year 2006. In the year 2009-2010 the DODDSE schools combined Divisions 3 and 4; therefore, making Brussels American School division 3 again. Of all the DoDDS schools, Brussels American School holds the highest percentage of students who graduate, highest average AP & SAT scores, and highest acceptance rate to the Service Academies, with two of the fourteen people in the senior class of 2016 going to the U.S. Air Force Academy and U.S. Coast Guard Academy.  A prime example of this is the AP Chemistry class of 2009, where seven of the eight students achieved fives on the AP exam.

References

External links

 Official website

Educational institutions established in 1967
International schools in Belgium
Secondary schools in Belgium
Education in Brussels
American international schools in Europe
Department of Defense Education Activity
1967 establishments in Belgium
Buildings and structures in Flemish Brabant
Zaventem